Wilcza Głowa ("Wolf's Head") is a Polish coat of arms. It was used by several szlachta families of the Kingdom of Poland and Grand Duchy of Lithuania, and later in the times of the Polish–Lithuanian Commonwealth.

History

Blazon

Notable bearers

Notable bearers of this coat of arms include:

See also

 Polish heraldry
 Heraldry
 Coat of arms
 List of Polish nobility coats of arms

Sources 

Polish coats of arms